Augeiae or Augeiai was an ancient town of Locris Epicnemidia, near Scarpheia, mentioned by Homer in the Catalogue of Ships in the Iliad, but which had disappeared in the time of Strabo and its territory had been taken by Scarpheia.

Its site is unlocated.

References

Populated places in Epicnemidian Locris
Former populated places in Greece
Locations in the Iliad
Lost ancient cities and towns